Five ships of the British Royal Navy have been named HMS Torbay, after Torbay on the southwest English coast.

 , an 80-gun second rate launched in 1693, rebuilt in 1719 and broken up in 1749.
 HMS Torbay was previously , a 90-gun second rate launched in 1683, renamed Torbay in 1750 and sold in 1785.
 , an  launched in 1919.  She was transferred to the Royal Canadian Navy in 1928 and renamed .  She was sold in 1937.
 , a T-class submarine launched in 1940 and sold in 1945.
 , a  nuclear submarine launched 1985 and decommissioned in 2017.

Royal Navy ship names